Mickey's Surprise is a 1929 short film in Larry Darmour's Mickey McGuire series starring a young Mickey Rooney. Directed by Albert Herman, the two-reel short was released to theaters on September 15, 1929 by RKO.

Synopsis
Mickey and the kids put on a show at school.

Cast
Mickey Rooney - Mickey McGuire
Jimmy Robinson - Hambone Johnson
Delia Bogard - Tomboy Taylor
Marvin Stephens - Katrink
Kendall McComas - Stinkie Davis
George "Sloppy" Gray - Teacher
Fern Emmett - Lady

External links 
 

1929 films
1929 comedy films
American black-and-white films
Mickey McGuire short film series
1929 short films
American silent short films
American comedy short films
1920s American films
Silent American comedy films